Strikeforce: Houston, was a mixed martial arts event held by Strikeforce on August 21, 2010 at the Toyota Center in Houston, Texas, United States.

Background
After Jake Shields vacated the Strikeforce Middleweight Championship, there was much speculation that there would be a tournament for the title.  However, Strikeforce announced that Ronaldo Souza and Tim Kennedy would fight for the championship at this event.

André Galvão was originally scheduled to face Nate Moore, however Jorge Patino stepped in on late notice for the injured Moore.

The Cormier/Riley and Galvão/Patino preliminary bouts streamed live on Sherdog.com.

This was the last Strikeforce event branded with their original logo. The promotion debuted their new & final logo at Strikeforce: Diaz vs. Noons II in October 2010.

The event drew an estimated 367,000 viewers, with a peak at 470,000 on Showtime.

Results

References

See also
 Strikeforce (mixed martial arts)
 List of Strikeforce champions
 List of Strikeforce events
 2010 in Strikeforce

Houston
2010 in mixed martial arts
Mixed martial arts in Houston
2010 in sports in Texas